Spillman may refer to:

People
C. J. Spillman (born 1986), American football player
George Spillman (1856–1911), British cricketer
Jack Owen Spillman (born 1969), American serial killer
Karl Spillman Forester (1940–2014), American judge
Ken Spillman (born 1959), Australian author
Lynette Spillman (born 1960), American sociologist and professor
Mel Spillman (born 1948), American probate clerk and fraudster
Miskel Spillman (1897–1992), American TV guest-hosting contest winner from Saturday Night Live
William Jasper Spillman (1863–1931), American economist and founder of agricultural economics

Places
Spillman, Louisiana, an unincorporated community, United States
Spillman Creek, a river in Kansas, United States

See also
Herschell-Spillman, a former amusement ride manufacturer
Spilman (disambiguation)
Spillmann, a surname
Stillman (disambiguation)
Spelman (disambiguation)